"I Like You So Much Better When You're Naked" is the twelfth episode of the sixth season of the American television medical drama Grey's Anatomy, and the show's 114th episode overall. It was written by Tony Phelan and Joan Rater, and directed by Donna Deitch. It aired on the American Broadcasting Company in the United States on January 21, 2010. In the episode, Dr. Izzie Stevens (Katherine Heigl) returns to the fictional Seattle Grace Mercy West Hospital with the fear that her estranged husband Dr. Alex Karev (Justin Chambers) is moving on, hoping to make amends. Further storylines include Dr. Derek Shepherd          (Patrick Dempsey) contemplating as to whether or not he should report the chief of surgery Dr. Richard Webber (James Pickens Jr.), for his alcoholism, and Dr. Callie Torres (Sara Ramirez) battling the chicken pox.

The episode was originally intended to serve as the final episode before Heigl's maternity leave, but was later marked as her final appearance as a series-regular. Stevens' fate was left unresolved until 10 seasons later, in the season 16 episode, "Leave a Light On". Kim Raver (Dr. Teddy Altman) reprised her role as a guest-star, in addition to Jesse Williams (Dr. Jackson Avery) and Mitch Pileggi (Larry Jennings). The title of the episode is a reference to the song "I Like You So Much Better When You're Naked" by Norwegian rock musician Ida Maria. "I Like You So Much Better When You're Naked" opened to positive reviews, with Sandra Oh's (Dr. Cristina Yang) performance garnering particular praise. Upon its initial airing, the episode was viewed by 12.70 million Americans, ranked #2 in its time-slot, and garnered a 4.7/12 Nielsen rating/share in the 18–49 demographic.

Plot
The episode begins with general surgeon Dr. Miranda Bailey (Chandra Wilson) performing a special surgery, and to her dismay, the chief of surgery Dr. Richard Webber (James Pickens Jr.) is absent from the operating room. At Dr. Meredith Grey (Ellen Pompeo)'s house, Dr. Lexie Grey (Chyler Leigh) is engaging in sexual activity with Dr. Alex Karev (Justin Chambers), while his wife, Dr. Izzie Stevens (Katherine Heigl) is estranged. In the next room, Meredith begins arguing with her husband, Dr. Derek Shepherd (Patrick Dempsey), over whether or not he should report the chief of surgery, Dr. Richard Webber's (James Pickens Jr.) alcoholism to Larry Jennings (Mitch Pileggi), the hospital's president.

Dr. Izzie Stevens (Katherine Heigl) returns home after being on a hiatus, due to her being fired from the hospital, to rekindle her relationship with Karev. Dr. Callie Torres (Sara Ramirez) and Dr. Arizona Robbins (Jessica Capshaw) are being intimate in the hospital's on-call room, until Torres discovers that she has the chicken pox. Robbins places her in isolation, because she wants a "sexy" relationship, and does not think the chicken pox can account to that. Meredith is set to perform a pancreaticoduodenectomy procedure with Dr. Jackson Avery (Jesse Williams), under the supervision of Webber, but under the influence of alcohol, he falls asleep, and Bailey performs the surgery. In an effort to reason with Meredith, Shepherd offers her a proposition. Shepherd is aware that he will receive Webber's job if he is reported, and therefore will be in charge of hiring. He explains to Meredith that if she lets him report the chief, he will let Stevens re-obtain her job.

Stevens enters the hospital to receive a Positron emission tomography, due to her cancer. When it is revealed that she is now cancer-free, her happiness leads Meredith to allowing Shepherd to report Webber. In the previous episode, "Blink", Dr. Cristina Yang (Sandra Oh) told cardiothoracic surgeon Dr. Teddy Altman    (Kim Raver) that she could have Dr. Owen Hunt (Kevin McKidd), her boyfriend, if she continued to mentor her at Seattle Grace Mercy West. An appalled Altman reveals this to Hunt; however, he and Yang subsequently mend their relationship, and Altman continues to work at the hospital. Lexie meets up with Dr. Mark Sloan (Eric Dane), her ex-boyfriend, and reveals that she had sex with Karev. Sloan reveals that he too was involved in sexual activity, but is unable to forgive Lexie. At the conclusion of the work-day, Stevens approaches Karev, seeking reconciliation, but he explains that he does not deserve to be treated the way he was, and asks her to leave. Meredith informs Stevens that she is getting her job back, but disinterested, Stevens departs, seeking a fresh start to life.

Production

The episode was written by Tony Phelan and Joan Rater, and directed by Donna Deitch. David Greenspan edited the episode and Danny Lux served as the music coordinator. The episode was broadcast with Dolby Digital sound, being aired in both standard and high-definition, and running for 43 minutes without commercials. Featured music included Ingrid Michaelson's "Everybody" and Amanda Blank's "Something Bigger, Something Better", and the episode was named after the song, "I Like You So Much Better When You're Naked", by Norwegian rock musician, Ida Maria. The episode saw Heigl briefly return after a 5-episode hiatus to film the romantic comedy, Life as We Know It. "I Like You So Much Better When You're Naked" was also planned to be the last episode before her maternity leave, however, in March 2010, when she did not return to the Grey's Anatomy set after her maternity leave, Heigl marked this episode as her last.

While writing the scene with Meredith and Shepherd fighting, Rater explained that she was intending to show how they matured, adding: "This is a real grown-up argument. Meredith isn't running away, getting all dark and going to Cristina for help getting out of her marriage. She's staying and fighting." While writing the episode, writers intended the theme of the episode to be "exposure", but after the episode was filmed, realized it was "ambition". Rater commented on this: "Derek wants to be Chief; Meredith wants to do a procedure that she knows she isn’t ready for; Cristina wants Teddy to stay." In the episode, Oh's character asked her fellow residents if they would choose love or surgery, if need be, with Stevens choosing love and Yang and Meredith choosing surgery. The Grey Anatomy staff offered the insight: "When we were first discussing this story we had a knock-down drag-out fight in the writers' room – if you had to choose your love or your art, which would you choose? And some of us came down on the Cristina side, and some of us came down on the Izzie side – that in the end love is all that matters." At the conclusion of the episode, Karev ended his marriage to Stevens. Rater expressed that the writers decided to have the fictional couple break-up, because Stevens wasn't sick anymore, and Karev would not have left her when she was.

Michael Ausiello spoke further on Katherine Heigl's perspective on Izzie's departure. He said, "[Katherine] thinks her Jan. 21 farewell - while not originally intended to be her last episode - oddly works as a bookend to Izzie's story. "Even though there's a part of me that would like to go back and do the quick Izzie farewell," she says, "I also think that my last scene - where Meredith says to Izzie, 'Don't go, we're your family,' and Izzie's response was, 'No you're not, you're just a bunch of people I worked with, and I can find that anywhere' - was kind of tragic and appropriate all at the same time. When I was playing the scene I was really trying to convey that, for Izzie, that was a lie that she had to tell herself to have the courage to have to move on."

Reception

Broadcasting 
"I Like You So Much Better When You're Naked" was first broadcast on January 21, 2010 in the United States on ABC. The episode was viewed by a total of 12.7 million Americans, down 0.20% from the previous episode. In terms of viewership, the episode ranked #2 in its 9:00 Eastern time-slot, just behind CBS' CSI, and #3 for the night, losing to CBS' The Mentalist and CSI. Although the episode experienced a low in viewership, its 4.7/12 Nielsen rating ranked #1 in its time-slot and the entire night, for both the rating and share percentages of the 18–49 demographic, beating out typically high-rated shows, including its spin-off Private Practice, Fox's Bones, CSI, The Mentalist, and NBC's juggernaut, The Office.

Critical Reception 

The episode received positive reviews from television critics. Prior to broadcast, E! Online Jennifer Godwin expressed her fear: "[I'm] a little afraid that Iz[zie] is just stopping by to break Alex's heart before vanishing again." After the episode aired, TV Fanatic Steve Marsi noted that the argument between Shepherd and Meredith "didn't work", calling him "aggressive". Marsi also commented on Oh's performance: "Incredible performance by Sandra Oh as always. You can see the inner turmoil even when few or no words are exchanged, forgetting you're watching an actress. Simply amazing." BuzzSugar called Sloan's inability to forgive Lexie "an unexpected twist", and referred to the tensions between Yang, Hunt, and Altman as "awkward".

The Huffington Post Michael Pascua opined that "I Like You So Much Better When You're Naked" "reestablished Meredith as the core character of the show", adding: "She was the one who had to deal with Derek's problems with the chief, the aftermath of Alex and Lexie, Cristina's driven nature, and had to console the chief." Pascua also called Altman's telling Hunt of what Yang told her "stereotypical", and praised Chambers' character for not taking Stevens back. Pascua was impressed with the chicken pox storyline, writing:

References

External links
"I Like You So Much Better When You're Naked" at ABC.com

Grey's Anatomy (season 6) episodes
2010 American television episodes